Fu-Te Ni (born 14 November 1982), nicknamed "Tudigong", is a former Taiwanese professional baseball pitcher for the CTBC Brothers of the Chinese Professional Baseball League. Ni was a professional baseball player from Taiwan's Chinese Professional Baseball League (CPBL). After his franchise, the Chinatrust Whales, disbanded on November 11, 2008, he signed a minor league contract with the Detroit Tigers in 2009. He has also previously played for the Fubon Guardians of the Chinese Professional Baseball League (CPBL). He is currently the pitching coach for ANYO Fresh, an amateur team in Taiwan.

Ni was called up to the Major Leagues in June 2009, becoming the sixth Taiwanese player to enter Major League Baseball. He is also the first player to transition from the CPBL to MLB. Ni made his major league debut on June 29, 2009, against the Oakland Athletics.

Career

Chinatrust Whales
Ni was drafted by the CPBL team Chinatrust Whales in 2005. He signed with the team in early 2007 and played for the entire CPBL 2007 and 2008 seasons. In the two years Ni had a 12–24 record with seven holds, four saves and a 3.43 ERA in  inning pitched. Ni won the CPBL strikeout Champion Award in 2008 season with 132 strikeouts.

Detroit Tigers 

Ni signed as a free agent with the Detroit Tigers on January 13, 2009. He was assigned to the Triple-A Toledo Mud Hens of the International League. In 24 games with the Mud Hens, Ni went 3–0 with a 2.60 ERA, and 32 strikeouts. Ni was called up on June 28, 2009, to replace the injured Nate Robertson.  Ni is the sixth Taiwanese player to enter Major League Baseball, and the fourth pitcher. He made his debut on June 29, 2009, against the Oakland Athletics, allowing one run in 1.2 innings with 3 strikeouts. The first major league batter he faced was slugger Jason Giambi, and Ni struck him out. Ni pitched 36 games with the Tigers in 2009 and compiled no wins or losses with a 2.61 ERA and 21 strikeouts.

After accumulating a 6.65 ERA in 2010, Ni was optioned to the back to the Mud Hens on June 30, 2010.

In February 2011 the Tigers listed him as a non-roster invitee to spring training camp.
On March 22, he was assigned to the  Mud Hens. He was 6–3 with a 3.24 ERA in 34 games (including 12 starts). Ni was released by the Tigers on August 7, 2012, after he was 2–2 with a 4.56 ERA in 7 games (5 starts) during the 2012 season.

Los Angeles Dodgers 
After not playing during the 2013 season, Ni was signed by the Los Angeles Dodgers to a minor league contract on December 13, 2013. However, he was released on March 31, 2014.

Lancaster Barnstomers/Camden Riversharks
Ni spent the 2014 season playing in the Atlantic League for two different teams. He began the year with the Lancaster Barnstormers before getting traded to the Camden Riversharks for future considerations.

Fubon Guardians
Ni signed with the Fubon Guardians of the Chinese Professional Baseball League for the 2015 season. After the 2020 season he elected free agency.

CTBC Brothers
Ni signed a one month contract with the CTBC Brothers of the Chinese Professional Baseball League for the 2021 season. After failing to secure a contract extension, he left the team on May 24, 2021.

International career

Ni selected Chinese Taipei national baseball team at the 2008 Olympics, 2009 World Baseball Classic, 2013 exhibition games against Japan, 2015 WBSC Premier12, 2016 exhibition game against Japan and 2017 World Baseball Classic.

Coaching career 
Ni became the pitching coach for the amateur Popcorn League team ANYO Fresh on November 11, 2021.

See also
 List of Major League Baseball players from Taiwan

References

External links 

, or Fu-Te Ni's online Album.

1982 births
Living people
Adelaide Bite players
Baseball players at the 2008 Summer Olympics
Camden Riversharks players
Chinatrust Whales players
Detroit Tigers players
EDA Rhinos players
Fubon Guardians players
Lancaster Barnstormers players
Leones del Caracas players
Expatriate baseball players in Venezuela
Major League Baseball pitchers
Major League Baseball players from Taiwan
Olympic baseball players of Taiwan
People from Pingtung County
Taiwanese expatriate baseball players in the United States
Toledo Mud Hens players
2009 World Baseball Classic players
2015 WBSC Premier12 players
2017 World Baseball Classic players
Taiwanese expatriate baseball players in Australia